Diana MacManus (born April 10, 1986) is a female backstroke swimmer from the United States. As a member of the USA National team she competed at the 2001 Goodwill Games held in Brisbane, Australia where she won two silver medals. At the 2002 Short Course World Championships in Moscow, Russia where she brought home two more bronze medals.

She then represented team USA at the 2002 Pan Pacific Swimming Championships in Yokohama, Japan and the 2003 Pan American Games in Santo Domingo, Dominican Republic where she won two gold medals and one bronze.  She is also a three-time national champion in the 100m and 200m backstroke. A native of San Diego, California, she was trained by coach Dave Salo of the Irvine Novaquatics from the age of 12. She broke the USA's 11-12 age-group national record at age 12 in 50 yard backstroke, and at the age of 14, MacManus attempted to make the U.S. Olympic team in the 100m backstroke, finishing in fourth place in the U.S. Olympic trials.

At the Brazil meet of 2001–2002 FINA Swimming World Cup, she won both the 50 and 100 backstrokes.

See also
 Swimming at the 2003 Pan American Games – Women's 100 meter backstroke

References
 Profile (Internet Archive version) 
 Articles in Los Angeles Times
 Profile at The-Sports.org
  San Diego-Imperial LSC Records: 11-12 Girls
 https://archive.today/20121205080750/http://www.hickoksports.com/history/panamwswim.shtml
 http://www.novaquatics.com/TabGeneric.jsp?_tabid_=4870&team=nova
 http://www.gbrathletics.com/sport/swimwcs.htm

1986 births
Living people
Swimmers from San Diego
Female backstroke swimmers
Medalists at the FINA World Swimming Championships (25 m)
American female swimmers
Pan American Games gold medalists for the United States
Pan American Games silver medalists for the United States
Pan American Games medalists in swimming
Swimmers at the 2003 Pan American Games
Goodwill Games medalists in swimming
Competitors at the 2001 Goodwill Games
Medalists at the 2003 Pan American Games
21st-century American women